Azerbaijan or Azarbaijan (Āzarbāijān ; , Āzerbāyjān ), also known as Iranian Azerbaijan, is a historical region in northwestern Iran that borders Iraq, Turkey, the Nakhchivan Autonomous Republic, Armenia, and the Republic of Azerbaijan.

Iranian Azerbaijan includes three northwestern Iranian provinces: West Azerbaijan, East Azerbaijan and Ardabil. Some authors also include Zanjan in this list, some in a geographical sense, others only culturally (due to the predominance of the Azeri Turkic population there). The region is mostly populated by Azerbaijanis, with minority populations of Kurds, Armenians, Tats, Talysh, Assyrians and Persians.

Iranian Azerbaijan is the land originally and historically called Azerbaijan; the Azerbaijani-populated Republic of Azerbaijan appropriated the name of the neighbouring Azerbaijani-populated region in Iran during the 20th century. Historic Azerbaijan was called Atropatene in antiquity and Aturpatakan (Adurbadagan) in the pre-Islamic Middle Ages. Some people refer to Iranian Azerbaijan as South (or Southern) Azerbaijan and the Republic of Azerbaijan as Northern Azerbaijan, although others believe that these terms are irredentist and politically motivated.

Following military defeats at the hands of the Russian Empire, Qajar Persia ceded all of its territories in the North Caucasus and Transcaucasia to Russia via the Treaty of Gulistan of 1813 and the Treaty of Turkmenchay of 1828. The territories south of the Aras River, which comprised the region historically known as Azerbaijan, became the new north-west frontier of the Persian Empire and later Iran. The territories north of the Aras River, which were not known by the name Azerbaijan at the time of their capture by Russia, were absorbed into the Russian Empire, renamed the Azerbaijan Democratic Republic during the country's short-lived independence from 1918 to 1920, incorporated into the Soviet Union as the Azerbaijan Soviet Socialist Republic, and finally became the independent Republic of Azerbaijan when the Soviet Union dissolved.

Etymology and usage
The name Azerbaijan itself is derived from Atropates, the Persian Satrap (governor) of Medea in the Achaemenid empire, who ruled a region found in modern Iranian Azerbaijan called Atropatene. Atropates's name is believed to be derived from the Old Persian roots meaning "protected by fire." The name is also mentioned in the Avestan Frawardin Yasht: âterepâtahe ashaonô fravashîm ýazamaide which translates literally to: "We worship the Fravashi of the holy Atare-pata." According to the Encyclopaedia of Islam: "In Middle Persian the name of the province was called Āturpātākān, older new-Persian Ādharbādhagān (آذربادگان/آذرآبادگان), Ādharbāyagān, at present Āzerbāydjān/Āzarbāydjān, Greek Atropatḗnē (̓Ατροπατήνη), Byzantine Greek Adravigánon (᾿Αδραβιγάνων), Armenian Atrpatakan (Ատրպատական), Syriac Adhorbāyghān." The name Atropat in Middle Persian was transformed to Adharbad and is connected with Zoroastrianism. A famous Zoroastrian priest by the name Adarbad Mahraspandan is well known for his counsels. Azerbaijan, due to its numerous fire-temples has also been quoted in a variety of historic sources as being the birthplace of the prophet Zoroaster although modern scholars have not yet reached an agreement on the location of his birth.

In the early the 19th century, Qajar Iran was forced to cede to Imperial Russia its Caucasian territories north of the Aras River (modern-day Dagestan, Georgia, Armenia, and the Republic of Azerbaijan), through the treaties of Gulistan (1813) and Turkmenchay (1828). Following the disintegration of the Russian Empire in 1917, as well as the short-lived Transcaucasian Democratic Federative Republic, in 1918, the leading Musavat government adopted the name "Azerbaijan" for the newly established Azerbaijan Democratic Republic, which was proclaimed on May 27, 1918, for political reasons, even though the name of "Azerbaijan" had always been used to refer to the adjacent region of contemporary northwestern Iran. Thus, until 1918, when the Musavat regime decided to name the newly independent state Azerbaijan, this designation had been used exclusively to identify the Iranian province of Azerbaijan.

History

Pre-Islamic period
The oldest kingdom known in Iranian Azerbaijan is that of the Mannea who ruled a region south-east of Lake Urmia centered around modern Saqqez. The Manneans were a confederation of Iranian and non-Iranian groups. According to Professor Zadok:

The Mannaeans were conquered and absorbed by an Iranian people called Matieni, and the country was called Matiene, with Lake Urmia called Lake Matianus. Matiene was later conquered by the Medes and became a satrapy of the Median empire and then a sub-satrapy of the Median satrapy of the Persian Empire.

According to Encyclopædia Britannica, the Medes were an:

After Alexander the Great conquered Persia, he appointed (328 BC) as governor the Persian general Atropates, who eventually established an independent dynasty. The region, which came to be known as Atropatene or Media Atropatene (after Atropates), was much disputed. In the 2nd century BC, it was liberated from Seleucid domination by Mithradates I of Arsacid dynasty, and was later made a province of the Sassanid Empire of Ardashir I. Under the Sassanids, Azerbaijan was ruled by a marzubān, and, towards the end of the period, belonged to the family of Farrokh Hormizd.

Large parts of the region were conquered by the Kingdom of Armenia. Large parts of the region made up part of historical Armenia. The parts of historical Armenia within what is modern-day Azerbaijan comprise; Nor Shirakan, Vaspurakan, and Paytakaran. Vaspurakan, of which large parts were located in what is modern-day Iranian Azerbaijan is described as the cradle of Armenian civilization.

On 26 May 451 AD, a very important battle was fought that would prove immensely pivotal in Armenian history. On the Avarayr Plain, at what is modern-day Churs (modern-day West Azerbaijan Province), the Armenian Army under Vardan Mamikonian clashed with Sassanid Persia. Although the Persians were victorious on the battlefield itself, the battle proved to be a major strategic victory for Armenians, as Avarayr paved the way to the Nvarsak Treaty (484 AD), which affirmed Armenia's right to practice Christianity freely.

Heraclius, the Byzantine emperor, briefly held the region in the 7th century until peace was made with the Sassanids. After the Islamic Conquest of Iran, Arab invaders converted most of its people to Islam and made it part of the caliphate.

Islamic period

Sasanian and early Islamic period
During the Arab invasion of Iran, the Spahbed of Iran was Rostam Farrokhzad, the son of Farrukh Hormizd, who was the son of Vinduyih, the uncle of Khosrau I and brother of the Sasanian usurper Vistahm. Rustam himself was born in Azerbaijan and led the Sasanian army into battle. He is also mentioned in the Shahnameh.

The Sasanian army was defeated at the battle of al-Qādisiyyah and Rostam Farrokhzad, along with many other Sasanian veterans, was killed. In 642, Piruz Khosrow, one of the Sasanian survivors during the battle of al-Qādisiyyah, fought against the Muslims at Nahavand, which was a gateway to the provinces of Azerbaijan, Armenia and Caucasian Albania. The battle was fierce, but the Sasanian troops lost during the battle. This opened the gateway for the Muslims to enter Azerbaijan. The Muslims then invaded Azerbaijan and captured Isfandiyar, the son of Farrukhzad. Isfandiyar then promised, in return for his life, that he would agree to surrender his estates in Azerbaijan and aid the Muslims in defeating his brother, Bahram. Bahram was then defeated and sued for peace. A pact was drawn up according to which Azerbaijan was surrendered to Caliph Umar on usual terms of paying the annual Jizya.

Muslims settled in Azerbaijan as they did in many parts of Iran. According to the Iranian Azerbaijani historian Ahmad Kasravi, more Muslims settled in Azerbaijan compared to other provinces due to the province's plentiful and fertile pastures. Local revolts against the Caliphate were common and the most famous of these revolts was the Persian Khurramite movement.

Abbasids and Seljuks

After the revolt of Babak Khorramdin, who was a Zoroastrian of neo-Mazdakite background, the Abbasid caliphate's grip on Azerbaijan weakened, allowing native dynasties to rise in Azerbaijan. Azerbaijan was taken over by the Kurdish Daisam and the Sallarid Marzuban, the latter united it with Arran, Shirvan, and most of Eastern Armenia. After confrontations with the local Dailamite and Kurdish populations who had already established their own dynasties and emirates in different parts of Azerbaijan, the Seljuks dominated the region in the 11th and early 12th centuries, at which point the linguistic Turkification of the native Iranian populations began. In 1136, Azerbaijan fell to the Atabakan-e-Azerbaijan and Atabakan-e-Maragheh. It was later invaded by the Khwarizm Shah Jalal ad-din who held Azerbaijan until the advent of the Mongol invasions.

In the early years of the 13th century, large parts of Azerbaijan were conquered by the Kingdom of Georgia, at the time led by Tamar the Great. Under the command of the brothers Zakaria and Ivane Mkhargrdzeli, the Georgians conquered Ardabil and Tabriz in 1208, and Qazvin and Khoy in 1210.

Mongols and Turkmens
The Mongols under Hulagu Khan established their capital at Maragheh. The book Safina-yi Tabriz describes the general state of Tabriz during the Ilkhanid period. After being conquered by Timur in the 14th century, Tabriz became an important provincial capital of the Timurid empire. Later, Tabriz became the capital of the Kara Koyunlu empire.

Safavid, Afshars and Qajars and loss of the adjacent Caucasian territories

It was out of Ardabil (ancient Artavilla) that the Safavid dynasty arose to renew the state of Persia and establish Shi'ism as the official religion of Iran. Around the same time, the population of what is now Azerbaijan and Iran were converted to Shiism, and both nations remain the only nations in the world with a significantly Shia majority, with Iran having the largest Shia population by percentage, with the Republic of Azerbaijan having the second-largest Shia population by percentage.

After 1502, Azerbaijan became the chief bulwark and military base of the Safavids. It was the chief province from which the various Iranian empires would control their Caucasian provinces, all the way up to Dagestan in the early 19th century. In the meantime, between 1514 and 1603, the Ottomans sometimes occupied Tabriz and other parts of the province during their numerous wars with their Safavid ideological and political archrivals. The Safavid control was restored by Shah Abbas but during the Afghan invasion (1722–8) the Ottomans recaptured Azerbaijan and other western provinces of Iran, until Nader Shah expelled them. At the beginning of the reign of Karim Khan Zand, the Azad Khan Afghan unsuccessfully revolted in Azerbaijan and later the Dumbuli Kurds of Khoy and other tribal chiefs ruled various parts of the territory. Azad Khan was defeated however by Erekle II. With the advent of the Qajars, Azerbaijan became the traditional residence of the heirs-apparent. Even until then Azerbaijan remained the main area from where the high-ranked governors would control the various territories and Khanates of the Caucasus while the main power stayed in Tehran.

Though the first Qajar Iranian ruler, Agha Mohammad Khan, had reconquered the Caucasus and all of Iran in several swift campaigns, such as the harsh re-subjugation of Georgia in 1795, Iran would eventually irrevocably lose all of the Caucasus region to neighbouring Imperial Russia during the course of the 19th century, which had a crucial impact on the region of modern-day Iranian Azerbaijan. Shortly after the reconquest of Georgia, Agha Mohammad Shah was assassinated while preparing a second expedition in 1797 in Shusha. The reassertion of Iranian hegemony over Georgia did not last long; in 1799 the Russians marched into Tbilisi, which would mark the beginning of the end of the Iranian-ruled domains in the Caucasus, comprising modern-day Georgia, Armenia, the Republic of Azerbaijan, and Dagestan thanks to the 19th century Russo-Persian Wars.

Since the late 17th/early 18th century, the Russians were actively pursuing an expansionist policy towards its neighbouring empires to its south, namely the Ottoman Empire and the successive Iranian kingdoms. Agha Mohammad Khan's death and the Russian troops entering the Iranian possession of Tbilisi in 1799, led directly to the Russo-Persian War (1804-1813), the first of a number of Russo-Persian wars during the 19th century, and the most devastating and humiliating one. By the end of the war in 1813 and the resulting Treaty of Gulistan, Qajar Iran was forced to cede Georgia, most of the modern-day Republic of Azerbaijan, and Dagestan to Russia. The only Caucasian territories remaining in Iranian hands were what is now Armenia, the Nakhichevan Khanate, and the Talysh Khanate. The next war, the Russo-Persian War (1826-1828), resulted in an even more humiliating defeat, with Iran being forced to cede the remaining Caucasian regions, as well as having Russian troops temporarily occupying Tabriz and Iranian Azerbaijan. As Iran was unwilling to allow the Russians to gain possession over its Caucasian territories in the North Caucasus and South Caucasus, the millennia-old ancient ties between Iran and the Caucasus region were only severed by the superior Russian force of Russia through these 19th-century wars.

The area to the North of the river Aras, which included the territory of the contemporary republic of Azerbaijan, eastern Georgia, Dagestan, and Armenia, were Iranian territory until they were occupied by Russia during the 19th century.

Through the course of the 19th century Iran lost to Russia regions which had been part Iran for centuries. By the end of the 19th century, the border between Iran and Russia was set more southwards, at the Aras River, which is currently the border between Iran and Armenia – Azerbaijan.

Subsequently, the Russians were very influential in Northern Iran including Azerbaijan (as Northern Iran fell into Russia's sphere of influence for decades). After 1905, the representatives of Azerbaijan were very active in the Iranian Constitutional Revolution as a result to this Russian influence.

Contemporary age

The Russian (Tsarist) army occupied Iranian Azerbaijan in 1909 and again in 1912–1914 and 1915–1918, followed by Ottoman forces in 1914–1915 and 1918–1919; Bolshevik forces occupied Iranian Azerbaijan and other parts of Iran in 1920–1921, and Soviet forces occupied Iranian Azerbaijan in 1941, creating a very short-lived autonomous, Soviet-supported state from November 1945 to November 1946, which was dissolved after the reunification of Iranian Azerbaijan with Iran in November of the same year. The period roughly from the last major Russo-Persian War up to this date is so-called the period of high Russian influences in Iran. All of Northern Iran, including Iranian Azerbaijan, Gilan, Mazandaran, Qazvin, and many other places all the way up to Isfahan fell into the Russian sphere of influence. Russian armies were stationed in many regions of Iranian Azerbaijan, Russian schools were founded, and many Russians settled in the region, but less than in Gilan and Mazandaran. Also, Azerbaijan saw the large influx of the so-called White émigrées who fled to Iran following the Bolshevik revolution in Russia. Iranian nationalism is partly the product of Azerbaijani intellectuals. Azerbaijani provinces have played a major in the cultural and economic life of Iran in both the Pahlavi era as well as the Iranian Constitutional and Islamic revolution.

Monuments
The Iranian provinces of Azerbaijan, both West and East, possess a large number of monuments from all periods of history.

Geography
Iranian Azerbaijan is generally considered the north-west portion of Iran comprising the provinces of East Azerbaijan, West Azerbaijan, and Ardabil. It shares borders with the Republic of Azerbaijan, Armenia, Turkey, and Iraq. There are 17 rivers and two lakes in the region. Cotton, nuts, textiles, tea, machinery, and electrical equipment are the main industries. The northern, alpine region, which includes Lake Urmia, is mountainous, with deep valleys and fertile lowlands.

The region is bounded in the north by Armenia and the Republic of Azerbaijan and in the West by Lake Urmia and Kurdish-inhabited areas of Iran, and in the East by Gilan.

Mountains
 Sabalan is an inactive stratovolcano in Ardabil province of northwestern Iran. It is the third highest mountain in Iran and has a permanent crater lake formed at its summit. Sabalan has a ski resort (Alvares) and different tourist areas such as the Sarein spa. The mountain is known for its beautiful vistas, including the Shirvan gorge, where few climbers ever venture.
 Sahand is a massive, heavily eroded stratovolcano in northwestern Iran. At , it is the highest mountain in the Iranian province of East Azerbaijan.
 Eynali is a small mountain range in north of Tabriz, Iran. The range has a couple of peaks including Eynali, Halileh, Pakeh-chin, Bahlul and the highest one Dand.
Tulips are cultivated on the rich volcanic soil of Mount Bozgush, and medicinal herbs such as pennyroyal, thyme, borage, nettle and liquorice grow wild on the mountain's slopes. Mount Bozgush is a stratovolcano composed mostly of andesite.

Rivers

Most of the biggest rivers in Azerbaijan flow into either Urmia Lake or the Caspian Sea (both of which are endorheic). Some of the major rivers are:
 Urmia Lake basin: Aji Chay (Quri Chay), Zarriné-Rūd, Gadar River and many small permanent and seasonal rivers.
 Caspian Sea basin: Qizil Üzan, Sefīd-Rūd and Aras River (Zangmar River)

Biosphere reserve

The biosphere is also home to some 23,500 nomads. Arasbaran is confined to Aras River in the north, Meshgin Shahr County and Moghan in the east, Sarab County in the south, and Tabriz and Marand counties in the west.

Lakes
 Urmia Lake is a salt lake near Iran's border with Turkey. The lake is between the provinces of East Azerbaijan and West Azerbaijan, west of the southern portion of the similarly shaped Caspian Sea. It is the largest lake in the Middle East,
 Shorabil Lake is located in a hilly area south of Ardabil. Ardabil University is located near the lake.
 Gori Lake is a small fresh to brackish lake in the uplands of East Azerbaijan Province. Together with the adjacent reed marshes it is an important breeding area for waterfowl. A  site was designated as a Ramsar Convention wetland protection site on 23 June 1975.
 Neor Lake is located in a hilly area south of the Province of Ardabil, on the Ardabil–Khalkhal road.

Plain
The Mugan plain is a plain located between Iran and the southern part of the Republic of Azerbaijan. The highest density of irrigation canals is in the section of the Mugan plain which lies in the Republic of Azerbaijan. It is located on the bank of the Aras river extending to Iran.

The Urmia Plain is in the West Azerbaijan Province, situated on western side of Lake Urmia and the eastern side of Turkish border.

Politics

In Azerbaijan

Assembly of Experts
Of the 86 members of Assembly of Experts, 11 are representative of the Azerbaijan region. Ali Meshkini from Meshgin Shahr in the Ardabil Province was Chairmen of the Assembly of Experts since 1983 to 2007.
 5 representative of East Azerbaijan.
 3 representative of West Azerbaijan.
 2 representative of Ardabil Province.
 1 representative of Zanjan Province.

Islamic Consultative Assembly
Of the 290 members of Islamic Consultative Assembly, 44 are representative of Azerbaijan region. in the Azerbaijan region 40/44 Azerbaijani are in parliament the members of the Fraction of Turkic regions.
Electorate According to County

Electoral district of East Azerbaijan 19
Tabriz, Osku and Azarshahr 6
Mianeh 2 
Kaleybar, Khoda Afarin 1
Marand and Jolfa 1
Sarab 1
Bostanabad 1
Maragheh and Ajabshir 1
Hashtrud and Charuymaq 1
Bonab 1
Varzaqan 1
Ahar and Heris 1
Shabestar 1
Malekan 1

Electoral district of West Azerbaijan 12
Urmia 3
Miandoab, Shahin Dezh, Takab 2 
Khoy, Chaypareh 1
Mahabad 1 (Kurd)
Bukan 1 (Kurd)
Maku, Poldasht, Showt, Chaldoran 1
Nagadeh, Oshnavieh 1 (Kurd)
Salmas 1
Piranshahr, Sardasht 1 (Kurd)

Electoral district of Ardabil Province 7
Ardabil, Nir, Namin and Sareyn 3

Germi 1
Meshginshahr 1

Khalkhal and Kowsar 1

Parsabad and Bilesavar 1

Electoral district of Zanjan Province 5
Zanjan, Tarom 2

Abhar, Khorramdarreh 1
Khodabandeh 1

Ijrud, Mahneshan 1

Cabinet of Iran
 Mohammadreza Nematzadeh: Minister of Industries and Business
 Hamid Chitchian: Minister of Energy
 Shahindokht Molaverdi: vice president of Iran the section Women and Family Affairs.

Consulate

Military
Several Iranian Army and Sepah divisions and brigades are based in Azerbaijan, including:

Economy

The economy in Iranian Azerbaijan is based on Heavy industries, food industries, agriculture, and handicraft. The biggest economic hub is Tabriz which contains the majority of heavy industries and food industries. Iranian Azerbaijan has two free trade zones designated to promote international trade: Aras Free Zone and Maku Free Zone. The agriculture industry in Iranian Azerbaijan is relatively better than many other parts of the country because of comparatively higher precipitation. Handicrafts are mostly a seasonal industry mostly in rural areas during wintertime when the agriculture season is finished. There are 500 important production and industrial unit in this area. in October 2016, 500 Regional economic giant was introduced in 5 areas and 19 groups.

Free trade zones and exhibition centers
 Tabriz International Exhibition Center: which is a complex with vast exhibition infrastructures, is located in the eastern part of Tabriz. It holds over forty commerce exhibitions on a yearly schedule. The most famous fair is TEXPO, which is a general trade fair.
 Aras Free Zone: is situated in East Azerbaijan province, in the north-west of Iran, adjacent to Nakhchivan Autonomous Republic, Armenia and the Republic of Azerbaijan. Existence of the greenhouse town in the AFTZ, which has been built upon cooperation of Agricultural Jihad Ministry, has paved the ground for presence of investors in the arena of planting hydroponic products. The 500-megawatt combined cycle power plant project which is currently underway in AFTZ as a joint investment venture with foreign parties.
 Maku Free Zone: is situated in West Azerbaijan province, in the north-west of Iran, adjacent to Turkey.

Heavy industries
Industries include machine tools, vehicle factories, oil refineries, petrochemical complexes, food processing, cement, textiles, electric equipment, and sugar milling. Oil and gas pipelines run through the region. Wool, carpets, and metalware are also produced. In some factories and major companies in Azerbaijan include:
 Iran Tractor Manufacturing Company (ITMCO): is a producer of tractor, diesel engines, and other auto parts and provider of industrial services with its headquarter and main site in Tabriz. ITMCO has manufacturing sites in several countries and it exports different products to ten countries. The company is an ISO 9001 audited, and has also received several rewards of quality and exporting. ITMCO is listed as one of Iran's 100 fortune brands.
 Goldstone Tires: operating under the brand Goldstone Tires is an Iranian tire manufacturer for automobiles, commercial trucks, light trucks, SUVs, race cars, airplanes, and heavy earth-mover machinery in Ardabil. Artawheel Tire is currently the largest non-government owned tire manufacturer in Iran by marketshare. The company currently has agreements with Iran Khodro Tabriz to develop tires for the Peugeot 206 Models
 Mashin Sazi Tabriz (MST): is manufacturer of industrial machinery and tools Tabriz. The major products of the factory are turning machines, milling machines, drilling machines, grinding machines, and tools.
 Rakhsh Khodro Diesel: is an Iranian truck manufacturer established in 2005 and located in Tabriz. This company is a strategic partner of Kamaz of Russia, JAC and Jinbei of China and Maz-Man of Belarus and produces Kamaz trucks, JAC light trucks, and its own designed minibus. Its headquarters is in Tabriz.
 Amico: is an Iranian truck manufacturer established in 1989 and located in Jolfa near Tabriz. This company produces light and heavy diesel vehicles.
 Iran Khodro Tabriz: is the leading Iranian vehicle manufacturer, with headquarters in Tehran. The company's original name was Iran National. In addition to Tehran, largest car factory in Iran have 5 automobile factories throughout the Iran. and "Iran Khodro – Tabriz" until the 2014 have produces capacity 520,000 Build 150 Samand Arisan instead of Bardo Pick-up Paykan also this Irankhodro site produces 100 Samand in day.
 and other major petrochemical companies, oil refineries and industries are including Machine works Company of Tabriz, Iranian Diesel Engine Manufacturing (IDEM), Tabriz Oil Refinery, Tabriz Petrochemical, Copper Mine Songon, etc.

Rugs and carpets
The Ardabil Carpet and Tabriz rug the best kind of Iranian carpet. Now 40 percent of Iranian carpet exports are carried through East Azarbaijan. Azerbaijani carpets and rugs are important:
 Tabriz rug is a type in the general category of Iranian carpets from the city of Tabriz.
 Heriz rug are Persian rugs from the area of Heris, East Azerbaijan, northeast of Tabriz. Such rugs are produced in the village of the same name in the slopes of Mount Sabalan.
 Ardabil rug and Ardabil carpet originate from Ardabil. Ardabil has a long and illustrious history of Azerbaijani carpet weaving. The reign of the Safavid dynasty in the 16th and 17th centuries represented the peak of Azerbaijani carpet making in the region.
 Karadagh rug or Karaja rug is handmade in or near the village of Qarājeh (Karaja), in the Qareh Dāgh (Karadagh) region just south of the Azerbaijan border, northeast of Tabrīz. The best-known pattern shows three geometric medallions that are somewhat similar to those in Caucasian carpets. The central one has a latch-hooked contour and differs in colour from the others, which are eight-pointed stars.

Food industries
More than fifty percent of entire Iranian food exports are carried from Iranian Azerbaijan. The major hub for the food industry in the region is Tabriz which includes the Shirin Asal, Aydin, Shoniz, Anata, Baraka and Chichak manufacturers. Outside of Tabriz Minoo Industrial Group in Khorramdarreh is another nationally recognized food manufacturer.

Agriculture
Grains, fruits, cotton, rice, nuts, and tobacco are the staple crops of the region.

Demographics

People

Iranian Azerbaijanis, are a Turkic-speaking people, of which are largely of Iranian origin and minority Caucasian. They number between 16 and 24 percent and between 15 and 16 million of Iran's population, and comprise by far the second-largest ethnic group in the nation. In the Azerbaijan region, the population consists mainly of Azeris. Azeris are the largest group in Iranian Azerbaijan, while Kurds are the second largest group and a majority in many cities of West Azerbaijan Province. Iranian Azerbaijan is one of the richest and most densely populated regions of Iran. Many of these various linguistic, religious, and tribal minority groups, and Azeris themselves have settled widely outside the region. The majority Azeris are followers of Shi'a Islam. The Iranian Azeris mainly reside in the northwest provinces, including the Iranian Azerbaijan provinces (East Azerbaijan, West Azerbaijan and Ardabil), Zanjan, as well as regions of the North to Hamadan County and Shara District in the East Hamadan Province, some regions Qazvin Province and also Azerbaijani minorities living in Markazi, Kordestan, Gilan and Kermanshah.

Smaller groups, such as Armenians, Assyrians, Kurds, Tats, Talyshs, Jews, Circassians, (and other Peoples of the Caucasus), and Persians also inhabit the region.

Religion
The majority of Azerbaijanis in Azerbaijan are followers of Twelver Shia Islam. Azerbaijanis commemorate Shia holy days (ten first days of the holy month of Muharram) minority Sunni Azerbaijani Turks (Shafi and Hanafi) who live in the Ardabil Province (Hashatjin and villages of Bileh Savar County) and West Azerbaijan province (near the cities of Urmia, Khoy and Salmas) and have population about 200,000 people in this area.

Immigration
Azerbaijani people mostly live in northwest parts of Iran, but large Azerbaijani populations can be found in Khorasan, mostly in Mashhad, as well as central Iran, due to internal migration to Tehran, Karaj, and Qum. Where they have settled, they have become prominent – not only among urban and industrial working classes – but also in commercial, administrative, political, religious, and intellectual circles. Azerbaijanis make up 25%– 33% of Tehran and of Tehran Province's population. They are the largest ethnic groups after Persians in Tehran and the Tehran Province. The governor of Tehran is Hossein Hashemi from Sarab; he was born in East Azerbaijan; Ali Khamenei, the Supreme Leader of Iran, was born in Mashhad and is of Azeri origin. The journals Varliq and Azari are printed by the Azerbaijani people in Tehran.

Population

According to the population census of 2012, the four provinces of East Azerbaijan (2012 pop. 3,724,620), West Azerbaijan (2012 pop. 3,080,576), Zanjan (2012 pop. 1,015,734), and Ardabil (2012 pop. 1,248,488) have a combined population of 9 million people.

Administrative divisions
Azerbaijan's major cities are Tabriz (the capital of East Azerbaijan), Urmia (the capital of West Azerbaijan), Zanjan (the capital of Zanjan Province), Ardabil (the capital of Ardabil Province) and Major cities non-capital of Province's Azerbaijan are Khoy and Maragheh.

New 2014 administrative divisions
 During Hassan Rouhani's government, the Ministry of Interior declared that the provinces of Iran would be organized into regions. Region 3 in Northwest Iran includes East Azerbaijan Province, West Azerbaijan Province, Ardabil Province, Zanjan Province, Gilan Province and Kurdistan Province.

Culture

Azerbaijanis, a Turkic speaking people, are culturally a part of the Iranian peoples and have influenced Iranian culture. At the same time, they have influenced and been influenced by their non-Iranian neighbors, especially Caucasians and Russians. Azerbaijanis in both Iran and the Republic of Azerbaijan are mostly Shiite Muslims. Azerbaijanis in Iran and in the Republic of Azerbaijan celebrate Nowruz, the Iranian new year, at the arrival of spring. Azerbaijan has a distinct music that is tightly connected to the music of other Iranian peoples such as Persian music and Kurdish music, and also the music of the Caucasian peoples. Although the Azerbaijani language is not an official language of Iran it is widely used, mostly orally, among the Iranian Azerbaijanis.

Literature
Many poets that came from Azerbaijan wrote poetry in both Persian and Azerbaijani. Renowned poets in Azerbaijani language are Nasimi, Shah Ismail I (who was known with the pen-name Khatai), Fuzuli, Nasimi and Jahan Shah were probably born outside what is now Iranian Azerbaijan. Azerbaijani was the dominant language of the ruling dynasties of the Turkic rulers of the area such as the Ak Koyunlu, Kara Koyunlu and later it was used in the Safavid court until Isfahan became capital and religious dignitaries, military. In the 16th century, Azerbaijani literature further flourished with the development of Ashik poetic genre of bards. During the same period, under the pen-name of Khatāī ( for sinner) Shah Ismail I wrote about 1400 verses in Azerbaijani, which were later published as his Divan. A unique literary style known as qoshma ( for improvisation) was introduced in this period, and developed by Shah Ismail and later by his son and successor, Shah Tahmasp and Tahmasp I. In the span of the 17th century, 18th and 19th century, Fizuli's unique genres as well Ashik poetry were taken up by prominent poets and writers such as Qovsi Tabrizi, Shah Abbas Sani, Khasta Qasim, Mirza Fatali Akhundov, Seyid Abulgasim Nabati, Ali Mojuz and others.

An influential piece of post-World War II Azerbaijani poetry, Heydar Babaya Salam (Greetings to Heydar Baba) was written by Azeri poet Mohammad Hossein Shahriar. This poem, published in Tabriz in 1954 and written in colloquial Azerbaijani, became popular among Iranians and the people of Azerbaijan Soviet Socialist Republic. In Heydar Babaya Salam, Shahriar expressed his identity as an Iranian attached to his homeland, language, and culture. Heydar Baba is a hill near Khoshknab, the native village of the poet.

Azerbaijan is mentioned favorably on many occasions in Persian literature by Iran's greatest authors and poets. Examples:

گزیده هر چه در ایران بزرگان
زآذربایگان و ری و گرگان
All the nobles and greats of Iran,
Choose from Azerbaijan, Ray, and Gorgan.
—Vis o Ramin

از آنجا بتدبیر آزادگان
بیامد سوی آذرآبادگان
From there the wise and the free,
set off to Azerbaijan
—Nizami

به یک ماه در آذرآبادگان
ببودند شاهان و آزادگان
For a month's time, The Kings and The Free,
Would choose in Azerbaijan to be
—Ferdowsi

UNESCO World Heritage Sites
Nine historical sites in Azerbaijan have been designated as World Heritage Sites by UNESCO:
 Bazaar of Tabriz: is one of the oldest bazaars in the Middle East and the largest covered bazaar in the world. The bazaar was declared to be a World Heritage Site in July 2010.
 Sheikh Safi al-Din Khānegāh and Shrine Ensemble: is the tomb of Sheikh Safi-ad-din Ardabili located in Ardabil, Iran. In 2010, it was registered on the UNESCO World Heritage List.
 Takht-e Soleymān: literally the Throne of Solomon, in earlier ancient periods known as Shiz or Adur Gushnasp, literally the Fire of the Warrior Kings) is an archaeological site in West Azerbaijan. It lies midway between Urmia and Hamadan, very near the present-day town of Takab,
 Dome of Soltaniyeh: located near Zanjan,  to the north-west of Tehran, used to be the capital of Mongol Ilkhanid rulers of Persia in the 14th century. Its name translates as The Imperial. In 2005, UNESCO listed Soltaniyeh as one of the World Heritage Sites. The road from Zanjan to Soltaniyeh extends until it reaches to the Katale khor cave.
 The Armenian Monastic Ensemble: St. Thaddeus Monastery, Saint Stepanos Monastery, Church of the Holy Mother of God, Darashamb, Chapel of Dzordzor and Church of Chupan are World Heritage Sites.

Colleges and universities
There are many universities in Azerbaijan, included units and centers: public university and private university Islamic Azad University, Payame Noor University, Nonprofit educational institutions, University of Applied Science and Technology.

Some of the most prestigious public universities in the area are:

Architecture
Azeri style is a style (sabk) of architecture when categorizing Iranian architecture development in Azerbaijan history. Landmarks of this style of architecture span from the late 13th century (Ilkhanate) to the appearance of the Safavid dynasty in the 16th century CE.

Ashik

Ashik is a mystic bard, balladeer, or troubadour who accompanied his song be it a hikaye or a shorter original composition with a long-necked lute. The modern Azerbaijani ashiq is a professional musician who usually serves an apprenticeship, masters playing saz, and builds up a varied but individual repertoire of Turkic folk songs. and The Coffeehouse of Ashiks is a coffeehouse in cities of Azerbaijan where ashiks perform Turkish hikaye. In cities, towns, and villages of Iranian Azerbaijan ashiks entertain audiences in coffeehouses.

Azerbaijan Cultural and Literature Foundation
Azerbaijan Cultural and Literature Foundation, was founded for the purpose of research, study and promote the study of the culture, art, language, literature, and history of Azerbaijan in four provinces (East Azerbaijan, West Azerbaijan, Ardabil and Zanjan) of Azerbaijan region.

Transportation

Air
Iranian Azerbaijan is connected to other parts of Iran and the world via several air routes. There are seven civil airports in the region and the biggest Airport in the region is Tabriz International Airport located in north-west of Tabriz. The other Airports are:

Air lines

Ata Airlines is an airline based in Tabriz, Iran. Operates scheduled domestic services and international services in the Middle East, as well as charter services including Europe. Its main base is Tabriz International Airport. This airplane company is in Azerbaijan with Eram Air.

Bridge

 Urmia Lake Bridge is a bridge in region. It crosses Lake Urmia and connects East Azerbaijan and West Azerbaijan.
 Tabriz Cable Bridge is the biggest cable-stayed bridge in Iran

Railway
Azerbaijan is connected to the rest of Iranian railways through a line that connects Tabriz to Tehran. This line continues from Tabriz to Jolfa city in the north of East Azerbaijan province and is connected to the railways of Nakhichevan. Tabriz-Jolfa railway is one of the oldest railways in Iran that was built between 1912 and 1916. This railway line is the only part of Iranian railways that has an electric line. Tabriz also connected to Turkey through Tabriz-Razi railways which were built 1960–1961.
The most important railways station in Azerbaijan is Tabriz Railway Station which was founded in West of Tabriz in 1917; the current railway building of Tabriz railway station was built during the second Pahlavi era by Iranian architect Heydar Ghiaï-Chamlou. The first railroad arriving at Tabriz had been built by Russians. The railway started from Jolfa, a city on the border of Iran and the modern Republic of Azerbaijan.

Active lines this railway included: Tabriz–Tehran, Tabriz–Nakhchivan Autonomous Republic, and Tabriz–Turkey.

Metro
Tabriz Metro  opened on 28 August 2015 with 7 km length and 6 stations. Line 1 is the first line under construction that connects Shah-Golu in the southeast to Laleh district in the southwest after passing through the city center of Tabriz.

Roads
A network of Iranian national roads connects cities and populated areas of Azerbaijan to each other and to other parts of Iran. The only freeway in Azerbaijan is Freeway 2 (Iran) which connects Tabriz to Tehran and it is planned to construct the rest of the freeway up to the Iran-Turkey border at Bazargan. Other roads and highways include Road 32 (Iran) which connects Tehran to Tabriz and continues to the Iran-Turkey border at Bazargan. Here is a list and map of roads that pass through Azerbaijan.

Media

TV and radio
 Sahand TV from Tabriz
 Eshragh TV from Zanjan
 Sabalan TV from Ardebil
 Azerbaijan TV from Urmia

Native language instruction
Azerbaijani language is not taught in Iranian schools; but for the first time at the level of academic education since 2016, Azerbaijani language and literature launched in Azerbaijan for Tabriz University.

Newspapers

Ardabil Province
 Ardabil Farda
 Ardabil Hamshahri
West Azerbaijan
 Araz Azerbaijan
Zanjan Province
 Mardom -e- No
 Zanjan Hamshahri

East Azerbaijan
 Azerbaijan
 Ark
 Amin
 Sorkhab
 Saib Tabriz
 Asr Azadi
 Fajr Azerbaijan
 Mahd Azadi

Sport

Sport Olympiad
For the first time, Sports Olympiad of northwest in 23 sports to host Ardabil city will be held the presence of West Azerbaijan, East Azerbaijan, Ardabil and Zanjan provinces.

Major sport clubs
Representatives of Azerbaijani in the top two leagues:

Football
 Tractor Sazi
 Machine Sazi
 Gostaresh Foolad
 Shahrdari Tabriz

Futsal
 Mes Sungun
 Behrad Ardabil

Volleyball
 Shahrdari Urmia
 Shahrdari Tabriz

Basketball
 Shahrdari Tabriz

Cycling Team

Major sport events
 2010 Asian Men's Cup Volleyball Championship Ghadir Arena in Urmia.
 2012 WAFF Futsal Championship Ghadir Arena in Urmia.
 2012 Asian Junior Men's Volleyball Championship Ghadir Arena in Urmia.
 16th Wrestle International Children's Day Shahid Poursharifi Arena in Tabriz.
 2014 Asian Men's Junior Handball Championship Shahid Poursharifi Arena in Tabriz.
 1976: Part of 1976 AFC Asian Cup's final tournament held in Bagh Shomal Stadium, Tabriz.
 Tour of Iran (Azerbaijan) since 1986.

Sports facilities
Large and important stadiums:

 Yadegar-e Emam Stadium
 Ali Daei Stadium
 Takhti Stadium
 Gostaresh Foulad Stadium
 Tabriz Cycling Track
 Shahid Pour Sharifi Arena
 Ghadir Arena
 Rezazadeh Stadium
 Marzdaran Stadium
 Tractor Stadium
 Sahand Ski Resort

See also

Notes

References

Sources

External links

 "Azerbaijan" (Columbia Encyclopedia, 6th edition; 2001–05)

Azerbaijan (Iran)
Historical regions of Iran
Azerbaijani-speaking countries and territories